Natalia Alexandra Gutiérrez Batista (born December 10, 1986),  better known by her stage name Natti Natasha, is a Dominican singer. She was signed to Don Omar's label Orfanato Music Group. Her debut EP, All About Me, was released on March 28, 2012, by Orfanato Music Group. Her debut album, Iluminatti, was released on February 15, 2019, by Pina Records and Sony Music Latin.

Early life
Gutiérrez was born on December 10, 1986 in Santiago de los Caballeros, Dominican Republic where she started her involvement in music. When she was seven, Natasha registered at the school of Fine Arts in Santiago, where she took classes for singing and developed her singing abilities, which she has described as one of the best times in her life. From a very young age, she had admired artists such as Bob Marley and Jerry Rivera, and especially Lauryn Hill, whom she still names as one of her favorites. Natasha also expressed that she has followed and admired Ivy Queen since the beginning of Queen's career, with Queen responding via Twitter: "Thanks for the respect, admiration. That's having class and more than anything intelligence". When she was 18, she moved to the Bronx hoping to make it in the "City of Dreams". There she met reggaeton veteran Don Omar who then signed her to his record label. She also was an engineer and worked at a Makeup factory. 

At the age of 18, Natalia began to compose and record her own songs, performing different musical performances that took place in her native Santiago and together with her friends, she decided to form the musical group "D'Style", arriving to record some musical themes, the grouping did not achieve the expected results and eventually disintegrated. As a result, Natalia decides to put in a brief pause her short musical career.

As of 2022, Natasha has been a vegan for more than seven years.

Career

2010–2016: Career beginnings 
Natasha was signed to Orfanato Music Group for a few songs, in 2010 released "Hold Ya (Remix)" with Gyptian and Don Omar. She was featured in a song by Don Omar, called "Dutty Love", recorded in 2011 and released in March 2012 and worked with Farruko on "Crazy in Love". The former's success led to another collaboration with Omar, "Tus Movimientos". Both songs are featured on Omar's album Don Omar Presents MTO²: New Generation, released in 2012.

2017–2018: Breakthrough and collaborations 
In 2017, Puerto Rican singer Daddy Yankee released the song "Otra Cosa" with Natasha. She released the single "Criminal", with Ozuna, which became an instant hit, reaching the top five of the Billboard Hot Latin Songs chart and being the most watched music video overall in 2017. In April 2018, Becky G released "Sin Pijama", a collaboration with Natasha. The song was Natasha's second global hit, peaking at number three on the Hot Latin Songs chart, being certified platinum within three weeks of release, and reaching one billion views in six months, being the most watched female song of the year. She has also collaborated with Bad Bunny, R.K.M & Ken-Y, Thalía, and Cosculluela. Natasha is currently signed to Pina Records.

2019–present: Iluminatti, Nattividad and further collaborations 
She released her debut album, Iluminatti on February 15, 2019, by Pina Records and Sony Music Latin. The album has a total of 15 songs, with two of them being features, "Te Lo Dije" with Anitta and "Soy Mía" with Kany Garcia. 
In 2019, she collaborated with Daddy Yankee, the Jonas Brothers and Sebastián Yatra on "Runaway". 
On September 24, 2021, at Billboard’s 2021 Latin Music Week, Natasha returned to the stage for the first time in two years, performing a medley of her hit songs.

Her six-episode docuseries Everybody Loves Natti premiered on November 19, 2021.

On January 13, 2022, Natasha collaborated with South Korean girl group Momoland on the song "Yummy Yummy Love", marking her return to singing in English since her debut EP and her first time collaborating with an Asian act.

Personal life 
In 2021, she became engaged to her longtime manager, Raphy Pina, founder of Pina Records. On February 18, 2021, she announced that she was pregnant with Pina's child. On May 22, 2021, she gave birth to their daughter, Vida Isabelle Pina Gutiérrez.

Discography

 Iluminatti (2019)
 Nattividad (2021)

Tours
 Natti Natasha Europe Tour (2018) 
 IlumiNatti Tour (2019)
 NattiVidad Tour (2022)

Awards and nominations

References

External links

 
 
 Natti Natasha on Spotify
 
 

1986 births
Living people
21st-century Dominican Republic women singers
Dominican Republic people of Spanish descent
Mixed-race Dominicans
People from Santiago de los Caballeros
Reggaeton musicians
Women in Latin music
Sony Music Latin artists
Latin music songwriters